is a former Japanese football player and manager.

Playing career
Naruo was born in Iwaizumi, Iwate on October 5, 1974. After graduating from Iwate University, he joined Japan Football League (JFL) club Montedio Yamagata in 1997. He played many matches as forward. In 1998, he moved to JFL club Sony Sendai. He became a regular player and scored 13 goals. In 1999, he moved to newly was promoted to J2 League club, Albirex Niigata. He played as central player in the club in 2 seasons. In 2001, he moved to J1 League club Júbilo Iwata. However he could not play at all in the match. In June 2002, he moved to Sanfrecce Hiroshima. However he could hardly play in the match and the club was relegated to J2 from 2003. In 2003, he moved to J2 club Sagan Tosu. He played as regular player in 2003. However his opportunity to play decreased in 2004 and he retired end of 2004 season.

Coaching career
Naruo first coached Albirex Niigata Singapore in S.League in 2009, ending the season in seventh position. He then went back to Japan to coach Grulla Morioka based in his local for five years, leading the club to ascend from semi-professional Regional Leagues to a J3 League team. Naruo rejoined Albirex Niigata Singapore in 2016, replacing Tatsuyuki Okuyama. He led the White Swans to an unprecedented sweep of all four of the league's major trophies. This led to him being named the 2016 S.League Coach of the Year. 2 days after winning the award, Naruo announced that he is leaving the newly crowned champions.

Club statistics

Managerial statistics

References

External links
 
 
 biglobe.ne.jp biglobe.ne.jp

1974 births
Living people
Iwate University alumni
Association football people from Iwate Prefecture
Japanese footballers
J1 League players
J2 League players
Japan Football League (1992–1998) players
Montedio Yamagata players
Sony Sendai FC players
Albirex Niigata players
Júbilo Iwata players
Sanfrecce Hiroshima players
Sagan Tosu players
Japanese football managers
J3 League managers
Singapore Premier League head coaches
Iwate Grulla Morioka managers
Albirex Niigata Singapore FC managers
Association football forwards